The Federal Transfer Center (FTC Oklahoma City) is a United States federal prison for male and female inmates in Oklahoma City, Oklahoma. It is operated by the Federal Bureau of Prisons, a division of the United States Department of Justice, and houses offenders and parole violators who have yet to be assigned to a permanent prison facility.  Most inmates who enter the federal prison system come through the facility.

FTC Oklahoma City is located adjacent to the Will Rogers World Airport, and serves as the main hub of the Justice Prisoner and Alien Transportation System, popularly known as Con Air. A cadre of low-security inmates are assigned to FTC Oklahoma City to perform food service and maintenance duties.

Piper Kerman, author of Orange Is the New Black stated that circa 2005 the women's section was "spotlessly clean" and "subdued".

See also

List of U.S. federal prisons
Federal Bureau of Prisons
Incarceration in the United States

References

External links
Official website

Buildings and structures in Oklahoma City
Oklahoma City
Prisons in Oklahoma